Sheree is an English female given name. It might come from the French chérie, meaning darling (from the past participle of the verb chérir, to cherish). 

It may refer to:

 Sheree Bautista, Filipino singer, actress, dancer, model
 Sheree Bradford-Lea, Canadian freelance cartoonist and mixed-media artist
Sheree Fitch (born 1956), Canadian children's author
Sheree Harris (born 1959), New Zealand cricketer
Sheree Gray (born 1985), American soccer defender
Sheree Jeacocke (born 1958), Canadian singer/songwriter
Sheree Murphy (born 1975), English actress and television presenter
Sheree North (1932–2005), American actress, singer, and dancer
Sheree-Lee Olson (born 1954), Canadian novelist, poet and journalist
Sheree Thomas, writer, book editor and publisher
Shereé Whitfield (born 1970), American television personality, cast member of The Real Housewives of Atlanta
Sheree J. Wilson (born 1958), American actress
Sheree Wingard (born 1988), Australian netball player
Sheree Winton (1935–1976), English actress
Sheree Zampino (born 1967), American actress and television personality, cast member of Hollywood Exes and The Real Housewives of Beverly Hills
Sheree, an artist name of Anna Fantastic
 Sheree, a character on Nick Jr.'s cartoon Julius Jr.

See also
Cherie
Sherrey
Sherrie
Shree 420

External links
Sheree